Christopher Kelly (1887 – 1960) was an English footballer who played for Leeds City and Stoke.

Career
Kelly was born in Tunstall and played amateur football with Goldenhill Wanderers before joining Stoke in 1908. He played in 20 matches during the 1908–09 season before returning to amateur football with Denaby United. He then had a short spell at Leeds City.

Career statistics

References

English footballers
Leeds City F.C. players
Stoke City F.C. players
Denaby United F.C. players
English Football League players
1887 births
1960 deaths
Association football defenders